Sarah Suzanne Stevens (born February 15, 1960) is a Republican member of the North Carolina House of Representatives. She has represented the 90th district (including constituents in Surry, Alleghany, and Wilkes counties) since 2009 and has served as speaker pro tempore since 2017.

Awards
 2015 Champion for Children Award. Presented by Children’s Hope Alliance and Benchmarks.

Committee assignments

2021-2022 session
Appropriations
Appropriations - Capital
Judiciary II (Chair)
Regulatory Reform

2019-2020 session
Appropriations
Appropriations - Capital
Judiciary (Chair)
Regulatory Reform
Homelessness, Foster Care, and Dependency

2017-2018 session
Appropriations
Appropriations - Justice and Public Safety
Judiciary I (Vice Chair)
Rules, Calendar, and Operations of the House (Vice Chair)
Regulatory Reform
Homelessness, Foster Care, and Dependency
State Personnel

2015-2016 session
Appropriations
Appropriations - Justice and Public Safety (Vice Chair)
Judiciary III (Chair)
Children, Youth and Families (Chair)
Regulatory Reform
State Personnel
Environment
Education - Community Colleges

2013-2014 session
Appropriations
Judiciary (Vice Chair)
State Personnel
Ethics
Health and Human Services

2011-2012 session
Appropriations
Judiciary
State Personnel
Education
Insurance

2009-2010 session
Appropriations
Judiciary I
Juvenile Justice
Science and Technology
Ways and Means - Broadband Connectivity

Electoral history

2022

2020

2018

2016

2014

2012

2010

2008

References

|-

1960 births
Living people
People from Mount Airy, North Carolina
University of North Carolina at Greensboro alumni
Campbell University alumni
North Carolina lawyers
21st-century American politicians
21st-century American women politicians
Women state legislators in North Carolina
Speakers of the North Carolina House of Representatives
Republican Party members of the North Carolina House of Representatives